Deportivo Kansas was a Peruvian futsal club that played in the División de Honor. The club was a runner-up in the 2003 season and division championships in both 2004 and 2006. In addition to winning the 2004 Copa Merconorte de Futsal, they placed second in the 2004 Copa Libertadores de Futsal; the farthest a Peruvian futsal club had come in that competition. The club dissolved in 2007.

History 

The foundation date of the club is unknown. The first news about Deportivo Kansas appeared after the club finished second in the División de Honor and subsequently qualified for the Copa Libertadores de Futsal.

In 2004, the club participated in the 4th Copa Libertadores de Futsal in Quito. Deportivo Kansas started the competition in Group B, and eventually finished in second place, qualifying for the semifinals. In the semifinals, Kansas defeated CUN (Colombia) and then won the title by defeating Samanes de Aragua (Venezuela). This qualified them for the Copa Libertadores Final.

The Copa Libertadores Final took place in Lima, in the PUCP Coliseum, on December 18 and 19. Kansas lost both matches against Malwee/Jaragua (Brazil).

In the domestic league, Kansas won its first title and qualified for the 2005 Copa Libertadores.

In 2005, the club participated in the 5th Copa Libertadores held in Lima. From there, Kansas started participating in Group B where they faced Malwee/Jaragua again. The club finished 4th (of 5 teams) and was eliminated. Kansas finished the domestic league without titles.

In 2006, Kansas again won the domestic league, but because of administrative troubles, the club didn't take part in the 2007 Copa Libertadores and then retired from the domestic league.

Managers 

  Ernesto Crespo (during 2004)

Titles

International

National

See also 

 UEFA Futsal Champions League

References 

Futsal in Peru